Kinesin-like protein KIF21A is a protein that in humans is encoded by the KIF21A gene.

KIF21A belongs to a family of plus end-directed kinesin (see MIM 600025) motor proteins. Neurons use kinesin and dynein (see MIM 600112) microtubule-dependent motor proteins to transport essential cellular components along axonal and dendritic microtubules.[supplied by OMIM]

References

Further reading

External links 
 Engle Laboratory CFEOM page
 GeneReviews/NCBI/NIH/UW entry on Congenital Fibrosis of the Extraocular Muscles
  OMIM entries on Congenital Fibrosis of the Extraocular Muscles